Night visual flight rules (NVFR) are the visual flight rules under which a flight may be performed at night primarily by visual reference. The alternative is flight by instrument flight rules (IFR), under which visual reference to terrain and traffic is not required.

In EASA countries the requirements for a NVFR rating (at an approved training organisation) are: 
 total of 5 hours of VFR flying at night (NVFR),
 including 3 hours dual flying (with an instructor),
 including 5 take-offs and landings at night,
 including 1 dual navigational flight by visual flight rules at night, at least 50 km and 1 hour. 

In many countries, NVFR is not permitted, in which case night flying is by IFR which requires an instrument rating. Countries that permit NVFR include Austria, Australia, New Zealand, Canada, Czech Republic, Germany, Hungary, Iceland, Ireland, Italy, Netherlands, Norway, Finland, France, Belgium, Luxembourg, Poland, Portugal, Serbia, Slovakia, South Africa, Spain, Sweden, Switzerland, the United Kingdom, the United States and Bosnia & Herzegovina.

References

Aviation law
Night flying